Ravenea dransfieldii is a species of flowering plant in the family Arecaceae. It is found only in Madagascar. It is threatened by habitat loss.

References

dransfieldii
Endemic flora of Madagascar
Endangered flora of Africa
Taxonomy articles created by Polbot
Taxa named by Henk Jaap Beentje